Sparkster: Rocket Knight Adventures 2 (known simply as Sparkster in North America and Europe), is a 1994 side-scrolling platform game developed and published by Konami for the Sega Genesis. A sequel to Rocket Knight Adventures, Sparkster involves the character of the same name attempting to save Princess Cherry and to stop the evil plans of King Gedol, who plans to take over the kingdom of Zephyrus. The game largely follows the same format as its precursor, with changes to the game's mechanics.

Sparkster: Rocket Knight Adventures 2 is the second game in the Rocket Knight Adventures series. Another game under the same title, Sparkster, but without the Rocket Knight Adventures subtitle and not continuing the plot of the first game, was released on the SNES in the same year. A direct sequel, Rocket Knight, was released in 2010.

Gameplay 
The gameplay of Sparkster is very similar to its precursor. Sparkster plays as a side-scrolling platformer, with a few areas in the game featuring auto-scrolling levels. Like its predecessor, the player can jump and attack using Sparkster's sword. Unlike the first game, the sword can no longer emit projectiles and can only perform melee attacks. Sparkster's maximum health has been reduced from eight hearts (16 hit points) to five hearts (10 hit points) compared to the first game.

The use of the rocket pack is changed in Sparkster. Instead of charging up a rocket attack manually, the rocket pack charges automatically. A rocket attack is now performed by pressing its separate Rocket button. The rocket pack charges up to two levels. If the energy gauge is filled red, the player can perform a rocket attack. If the secondary white gauge is filled, Sparkster can perform a "Screw Attack" which lets him travel a greater distance and can interact with certain level elements. Similar to its precursor, pressing the Rocket button will make Sparkster perform a rocket/screw attack where he blasts into one of eight directions where the player has inputted on the directional pad (if no direction is pressed, Sparkster will perform a stationary spinning attack).

Exclusive to this game is a feature known as the slot machine, which is displayed on the top right of the screen. When 10 blue gems are collected (or when one red gem is collected), the slot machine will activate and will give items that help Sparkster, or bombs that hurt Sparkster. In harder difficulties, bombs become more common.

Sparkster is composed of six stages, with each stage ending with a boss fight. The introductory sequence begins with a mech battle that can be skipped by pressing Start; however completing it is necessary to achieve the good ending of the game. Sparkster can find various items in the levels, including apples and meat (apples restore two hit points while meat restores all hit points), gems, rocket pack items that automatically make him perform a screw attack when collected, extra lives, and a power-up capsule that increases Sparkster's attack power until he is hit.

The introductory sequence of the game and boss fight of the fifth stage involves Sparkster controlling his robot mech, named the "SparkRobo", to battle the mech of Sparkster's arch-rival, Axel Gear. SparkRobo can throw a direct punch, an uppercut and can block Axel's punches and projectile attacks. If the Down direction is inputted, the SparkRobo will charge a more powerful attack.

Across all the stages, there are seven buried swords known as "Keys to the Seal" scattered throughout the levels (with Axel holding the seventh and final one; it is obtained by defeating him), which allows Sparkster to transform into Gold Sparkster if all of them are collected by the end of the Axel Gear fight of the sixth stage, which is necessary to achieve the "true" ending of the game. Gold Sparkster can deal more damage and can charge the rocket pack faster; however he is still able to sustain damage.

The game features multiple endings, with extended endings shown the harder the difficulty is. The "true" ending can only be seen if the game difficulty is set to Hard or Very Hard.

Plot 
Following the events of the first game, the kingdom of Zephyrus (labelled as Zebulos in the international manuals) comes under attack from the Gedol Empire, led by King Gedol. Seeking to control the kingdom, Gedol dispatches Sparkster's arch-rival, Axel Gear to kidnap Princess Cherry, the cousin of Princess Sherry, as a way to lure Sparkster to his doom.

During a search for one of the Keys to the Seal, Sparkster encounters Axel and his robo mech, prompting the two to fight. Sparkster emerges victorious at the end, retrieving the key. Later on, during a reunion with Princesses Sherry and Cherry, Axel Gear appears and kidnaps Cherry. Sparkster sets off to rescue Cherry by travelling to the Kingdom of Gedol, defeating many troops and winning occasional encounters with Axel. Eventually making it to Gedol's Castle, Sparkster confronts and defeats Axel Gear for the final time, with Axel leaving the last "Key to the Seal" behind. If all Keys have been collected, Sparkster transforms into Gold Sparkster and sets off to confront Gedol. If not, Sparkster sets off normally. Sparkster eventually confronts King Gedol and defeats him. If played on the Normal difficulty or harder, Gedol transforms into a giant, using his eyes as lasers. Sparkster eventually defeats him and slices him in half. Sparkster rescues Cherry and escapes the exploding castle.

If the game is finished on the Hard mode, Sparkster returns to the kingdom of Zephyrus, reuniting Cherry with the King and Sherry. With his job done, Sparkster flies elsewhere. If the player has achieved Gold Sparkster status, Sparkster returns to the location where he found the first Key to the Seal and returns it back into its place, reverting to his normal state in the process.

Reception
While not as acclaimed as the first game, Sparkster did receive a positive reception.  Electronic Gaming Monthly commented that some of the attacks "take some getting used to" and that the game needs more colors, but that the sound effects are fitting and the look is an improvement over the original Rocket Knight Adventures. They summarized it as "overall a good action title" and gave it a 7.2 out of 10. While they criticized the severe slowdown in the later levels, GamePro concluded that the game is "a good progression from the original", applauding the special attacks, smooth graphics and animation, and the fact that the harder difficulty levels actually include new sections in the stages instead of just adding more enemies.

Allgame gave the game a score of 4.5 stars out of a possible 5 stating “If you're in the mood for some high flying hijinks, and love action-platform games, give this Rocket Knight a whirl. You won't be disappointed”

Legacy 
A Sparkster comic based on the game was written by Nigel Kitching in the UK-made Sonic the Comic. In an interview, Kitching said that Sparkster was the easiest game to adapt into a story, due to it being similar to the Sonic the Hedgehog games. He was working on a second Sparkster story, but the plan was dropped when Fleetway were unable to obtain permission from Konami to use the character.

References

External links 
 
Sparkster: Rocket Knight Adventures 2 rating at Allgame
 Sparkster series review at Hardcore Gaming 101
 Sparkster: Rocket Knight Adventures 2 can be played for free in the browser on the Internet Archive

1994 video games
Fictional opossums
Konami games
Platform games
Sega Genesis games
Sega Genesis-only games
Side-scrolling video games
Steampunk video games
Video game sequels
Video games scored by Akira Yamaoka
Video games scored by Michiru Yamane
Single-player video games
Video games developed in Japan